James Feldeine (born June 26, 1988) is an American-Dominican professional basketball player for Fortitudo Bologna of the Lega Basket Serie A (LBA). He played college basketball for Quinnipiac University before playing professionally in Spain, Italy, Puerto Rico, Greece, Serbia and Israel.

High school career
Feldeine played basketball at Cardinal Hayes High School, before moving to Quinnipiac University. In his high school career, Feldeine was nominated to play in the McDonald's All-American Game, was twice named to the All-Bronx Burroughs First-Team, was named to the All-New York City Second-Team, and he was also named to the All-New York State Second-Team.

College career
Feldeine played college basketball at Quinnipiac University, with the Quinnipiac Bobcats. In his junior college season, during the 2008–09 season, Feldeine was named the NEC's Most Improved Player, and was also selected to the All-NEC First-Team, after being the Northeast Conference's top scorer. During his junior year, he was also twice selected as the NEC Player of the Week, and he was also selected to the NABC's All-District 18 Second-Team.

During his senior college season, in 2009–10, Feldeine was selected to both the All-NEC First-Team, and the NABC All-District 18 First-Team.

Professional career

Breogán (2010–2012)
Feldeine started his pro career in 2010 in Spain, with the Spanish club CB Breogán, where he played for two seasons, becoming one of the top scorers of the LEB Oro (Spanish 2nd Division).

Fuenlabrada (2012–2014)
In May 2012, Feldeine signed with the 1st-tier Spanish ACB League team Mad-Croc Fuenlabrada, on a contract through 2015. On January 19, 2013, Feldeine recorded a season-high 37 points, shooting 7-of-10 from 3-point range, along with four rebounds and five assists in a 72–69 win over Valencia.

Pallacanestro Cantù (2014–2015)
On 8 August 2014, he inked a one-year-deal to play in Italy, with the Italian League club Pallacanestro Cantù.

Vaqueros de Bayamón (2015)
On May 31, 2015, he signed with the Puerto Rican club Vaqueros de Bayamón, for the rest of the 2015 BSN season.

Panathinaikos (2015–2017)
On August 18, 2015, Feldeine signed a one-year deal to play in Greece with Panathinaikos of the Greek League and the EuroLeague. In February 2016, he extended his contract through 2018.

Crvena zvezda (2017–2018)
On August 2, 2017, Feldeine signed a two-year deal with the Serbian club Crvena zvezda. He played there only for the 2017–18 season.

Hapoel Jerusalem (2018–2020)
On August 11, 2018, Feldeine signed with the Israeli team Hapoel Jerusalem for the 2018–19 season. On November 7, 2018, Feldeine recorded a season-high 35 points, shooting 9-of-12 from 3-point range, along with five rebounds and four assists in an 88–64 win over ČEZ Nymburk. Two days later, he was named Champions League Gameday 5 MVP. On November 24, 2018, Feldeine recorded 28 points, including a three-pointer at the buzzer to give Jerusalem an 89–88 win over Hapoel Be'er Sheva. He was subsequently named Israeli League Round 8 MVP. On May 3, 2019, Feldeine was named Israeli League Player of the Month after averaging 23.8 points and 4.0 assists, shooting 57 percent from three-point range, along with 26.3 PIR per game in four games played in April.

On January 14, 2019, Feldeine signed a two-year contract extension with Hapoel Jerusalem. On December 7, 2019, Feldeine recorded a career-high 41 points in 29 minutes, while shooting 14-of-20 from the field in a 88–73 win over Hapoel Gilboa Galil. Three days later, he was named Israeli League Round 9 MVP.

Coosur Real Betis (2020–2021)
On August 2, 2020, he has signed with Real Betis of the Liga ACB.

Kuwait Sporting Club (2021)
On July 18, 2021, he has signed with Kuwait Sporting Club. On 9 October, he scored 19 points in the final of the 2021 Arab Club Basketball Championship, which Kuwait lost to Al Ahly.

Fortitudo Bologna (2021–present)
On November 29, 2021, he has signed with Fortitudo Bologna of the Italian Lega Basket Serie A (LBA).

National team career
Feldeine has also been a member of the senior men's Dominican Republic national basketball team. With the Dominican Republic's senior national team, he has played at the following international tournaments: the 2013 Marchand Continental Cup, the 2013 FIBA Americas Championship, the 2014 FIBA Basketball World Cup, and the 2015 FIBA Americas Championship.

Personal life
He was born in New York City. His mother is of Dominican descent.

Career statistics

EuroLeague

|-
| style="text-align:left;"| 2015–16
| style="text-align:left;" rowspan=2| Panathinaikos
| 26 || 19 || 26.1 || .368 || .314 || .756 || 2.2 || 2.1 || .9 || .2 || 8.4 || 6.4
|-
| style="text-align:left;"| 2016–17
| 33 || 29 || 19.9 || .406 || .378 || .609 || 1.1 || 2.0 || .9 || .2 || 6.7 || 5.5
|-
| style="text-align:left;"| 2017–18
| style="text-align:left;"| Crvena zvezda
| 28 || 17 || 25.0 || .374 || .345 || .865 || 1.6 || 2.9 || 1.2 || .1 || 11.6 || 9.7
|- class="sortbottom"
| style="text-align:left;"| Career
| style="text-align:left;"|
| 87 || 65 || 23.4 || .367 || .345 || .790 || 1.6 || 2.3 || 1.0 || .2 || 8.8 || 7.1

See also 
 List of foreign basketball players in Serbia

References

External links
James Feldeine at archive.fiba.com
James Feldeine at fiba.com
James Feldeine at euroleague.net
James Feldeine at draftexpress.com
James Feldeine at eurobasket.com
James Feldeine at esake.gr 
James Feldeine at legabasket.it 
James Feldeine at acb.com 
James Feldeine at twitter.com

1988 births
Living people
2014 FIBA Basketball World Cup players
ABA League players
American expatriate basketball people in Greece
American expatriate basketball people in Israel
American expatriate basketball people in Italy
American expatriate basketball people in Serbia
American expatriate basketball people in Spain
Basketball players from New York City
American men's basketball players
Baloncesto Fuenlabrada players
Basketball League of Serbia players
CB Breogán players
Dominican Republic expatriate basketball people in Serbia
Dominican Republic expatriate basketball people in Spain
Dominican Republic expatriate sportspeople in Greece
Dominican Republic expatriate sportspeople in Israel
Dominican Republic expatriate sportspeople in Italy
Dominican Republic men's basketball players
Fortitudo Pallacanestro Bologna players
Hapoel Jerusalem B.C. players
KK Crvena zvezda players
Kuwait SC basketball players
Liga ACB players
Pallacanestro Cantù players
Panathinaikos B.C. players
Quinnipiac Bobcats men's basketball players
Real Betis Baloncesto players
Shooting guards